Ross A. Jones (born January 14, 1960) is an American former professional baseball shortstop. He played for the New York Mets, Seattle Mariners, and Kansas City Royals of Major League Baseball (MLB).

Amateur career
A native of Miami, Florida, Jones attended Hialeah High School and played college baseball at the University of Miami. In 1979, Jones played collegiate summer baseball for the Hyannis Mets of the Cape Cod Baseball League (CCBL). Batting .413, he was named the league's outstanding pro prospect, and led the Mets to the league title. Jones was inducted into the CCBL Hall of Fame in 2006.

Professional career
Jones was drafted by the Los Angeles Dodgers ninth overall in the 1980 MLB draft. After four seasons in the Dodgers' farm system, Jones was traded with Sid Fernandez to the New York Mets for Bob Bailor and Carlos Diaz. He made the team out of spring training , but saw only limited action behind Jose Oquendo and Ron Gardenhire at short, and was used primarily as a pinch hitter or pinch runner. In thirteen plate appearances, he had a double and three walks. The double was a game winning walk-off hit against Al Holland and the Philadelphia Phillies on April 28. On May 13, in one of his few appearances on the field with the Mets, Jones committed an error that led to three unearned runs in the Mets 5-3 loss to the Dodgers. He was reassigned to their triple A affiliate, the Tidewater Tides shortly afterwards, and briefly reappeared with the Mets following the All-Star break. Jones split  between Tidewater and the double A Jackson Mets, and batted only .192 combined. 

Following the 1985 season, he was released, and signed with the Seattle Mariners. Despite batting .290 in the minors, with Seattle, he had only one hit in 21 at-bats for a .095 batting average.

He continued to hit well for the Omaha Royals, and earned a promotion to Kansas City. In 39 games, Jones batted .254, and had ten of his eleven career RBIs.

Following the season, Jones signed with the Oakland Athletics, but after committing four errors in three games with the triple A Tacoma Tigers, and getting only two hits in eighteen at bats, he was released. He signed with the New York Yankees shortly afterwards, spending the rest of the  season with their triple A affiliate, the Columbus Clippers, before retiring.

References

External links
 or Retrosheet, or Pura Pelota

1960 births
Living people
Albuquerque Dukes players
American expatriate baseball players in Canada
Baseball players from Miami
Calgary Cannons players
Chattanooga Lookouts players
Columbus Clippers players
Hyannis Harbor Hawks players
Jackson Mets players
Kansas City Royals players
Major League Baseball shortstops
Miami Hurricanes baseball players
New York Mets players
Omaha Royals players
San Antonio Dodgers players
Seattle Mariners players
Tacoma Tigers players
Tidewater Tides players
Tigres de Aragua players
American expatriate baseball players in Venezuela
Vero Beach Dodgers players